Booker Gliding Club was formed in 1978 following the amalgamation of Thames Valley Gliding Club and Airways Flying Club. It is based at Wycombe Air Park. Trading as Booker Gliding Centre, it is a community amateur sports club and a member of the British Gliding Association.

The club flies on all suitable days of the year and launches from Wycombe Air Park using grass areas adjacent to the active runways. The club performs all launches by aerotow. Gliders and motor gliders using the airfield operate in the dead side of the powered circuit and must obey strict rules to avoid conflict with powered aircraft and helicopters.

Current Fleet

Gliders
 Schleicher ASK 13
 2 x Schleicher ASK 21
 SZD-51 Junior
 Centrair C101 Pegase
 Schleicher ASW 19
 Slingsby T.21
 Schempp-Hirth Duo Discus

Motor Glider
 SF-25E Super Falke

Tugs
 Robin DR300-180R
  Robin DR400-180R
 Piper PA-25 Pawnee D
  Piper PA-18 "Super Cub" 180hp

Simulator
 The club has a gliding simulator based around the fuselage of a Schleicher ASK 13, which properly simulates force feedback and gives three monitors for enhanced field of view. This allows for training to commence in adverse weather.

Activities
The club operates training for pilots of all abilities, running training courses and temporary memberships for those new to gliding. It also sells trial lessons for those wishing to try gliding without committing to a full course. Club members organise frequent expeditions to other gliding sites in the UK and abroad, and the club frequently hosts local and national competitions.

References

External links
 Booker Gliding Centre
 BGC Activity Blog
 BGC Live Webcam (during daylight hours)
 

Sports organisations of the United Kingdom
Gliding in England
Flying clubs